Aspirants is a 2021 Indian Hindi-language coming-of-age web series produced by The Viral Fever (TVF) and created by Arunabh Kumar and Shreyansh Pandey, written by Deepesh Sumitra Jagdish and was directed by Apoorv Singh Karki. It stars Naveen Kasturia, Shivankit Parihar, Abhilash Thapliyal, Namita Dubey and Sunny Hinduja. The story follows three friends, Abhilash, Guri and SK who are preparing for the UPSC exam at Rajinder Nagar, Delhi.

The series began streaming on 7 April 2021, with five episodes have been premiered online on TVF's YouTube Channel and TVF Play. The season finale aired on 8 May 2021.

Premise
TVF Aspirants is about the past and present of three friends, Abhilash, Guri and SK, who are UPSC aspirants. The past explains their UPSC Aspirant life in Old Rajinder Nagar, Delhi and their struggle to crack the examination, while the present examines their lives outside the Rajinder Nagar as adults.

The series is set in Old Rajinder Nagar, a locality in Delhi that is home to several coaching centers and hostels for UPSC aspirants. The story revolves around Abhilash, Guri, and SK, three friends who are preparing for the UPSC exam. The series portrays the ups and downs of their lives, their personal and professional struggles, and their relationships with each other and with their families.

One of the key strengths of the series is its realistic portrayal of the lives of UPSC aspirants. The show provides an honest and raw portrayal of the challenges and struggles that aspirants face while preparing for the exam. The show depicts the long hours of studying, the pressure to succeed, the sacrifices that aspirants have to make, and the toll that the preparation takes on their mental and emotional well-being. It also highlights the financial struggles that many aspirants face, with several characters having to take up part-time jobs to make ends meet.

The characters in the series are well fleshed out and have distinct personalities. Abhilash is a serious and determined aspirant who is driven by his desire to succeed. Guri, on the other hand, is a more laid-back and carefree character who often finds himself in difficult situations. SK is a reserved and introverted character who struggles with his self-esteem and confidence. The interactions between the characters are realistic and relatable, and the chemistry between them is one of the highlights of the show.

The series also does a great job of exploring the personal lives of the characters and their relationships with their families. The show depicts the struggles of aspirants who come from modest backgrounds and have to face the expectations and pressure of their families. The show highlights the emotional toll that the preparation takes on the families of aspirants, who often have to make significant sacrifices to support their children's dreams.

Cast

Main
Naveen Kasturia as Abhilash Sharma
Shivankit Singh Parihar as Gurpreet Singh (Guri)
Abhilash Thapliyal as Shwet Ketu Jha aka SK
Sunny Hinduja as Sandeep 'Bhaiya' Singh Ohlan
Namita Dubey as Dhairya

Recurring
Kuljeet Singh as Walia Uncle
Bijou Thaangjam as Pema Rijiju
Neetu Jhanjhi as Walia Aunty
Nupur Nagpal as Pragati
Abhishekh Sonpaliya as Abhilash's PA
Darius Chinoy as Abhilash's boss
Preeti Agarwal Mehta as Anuradha Tiwari IAS
Sandeep Sharma as Manohar Prakash Sir
Jaspal Sharma as S. Chandrakant (Account head)
Salim Siddiqui as Xen Officer

Episodes

Soundtrack 

The series' soundtrack features 11 songs composed by Rohit Sharma, Tushar Mallek, and Nilotpal Bora and written by Deepesh Sumitra Jagdish, Avinash Chouhan, and Hussain Haidry. The track "Dhaaga" which is originally from TVF's previous series Yeh Meri Family (2018) was reused in the series.

Sequel
The trailer of a spin-off named SK Sir Ki Class was released on 16 February 2023. The spin-off focuses on SK about his life as UPSC teacher in Old Rajinder Nagar and as he struggles to make one of his students Ashish Arora (Gagan Arora) to prepare for UPSC, though he doesn't want to.

References

External links
 

Hindi-language web series
TVF Play Shows
Indian comedy web series
Indian drama web series
Civil Services of India
Union Public Service Commission
YouTube original programming
2010s YouTube series